Rose Marie Bravo (born Rose Marie La Pila January 13, 1951 in the Bronx, New York) is an American businesswoman. During her career, she has occupied leadership positions in several major fashion businesses and is now vice chairman at Burberry, of which she was CEO from 1997 to 2005.

Biography 
Bravo, whose Italian-born father owned a hairdressing business in the New York Bronx, attended the elite public Bronx High School of Science and went on to study English literature at Fordham University where she graduated in 1971. She graduated cum laude and joined Abraham and Straus' department store at Long Island as a buyer in 1971. In 1974, she was recruited by Macy's. When Macy's bought I. Magnin in 1988, she headed the acquired asset until the bankruptcy of Macy's in 1992. After five more years as President and Chief Merchant of Saks Fifth Avenue, and member of the Board of Directors of Saks Holdings Inc., Victor Barnett hired her to be chief executive of Burberry.

In her new job she initiated a radical reform of the British classic brand and improvements of the company structure. Her strategy included signing top model Kate Moss and recruiting the young designer Christopher Bailey in 2001, who was working for Gucci at that time. The Burberry line of products was greatly increased and especially the newly added perfumes contributed to the company's raising profits. Under her tenure, Burberry launched fragrances, purses, children's wear and doggie macs.

With Bravo as a CEO, Burberry managed to expand greatly on the US market. The company's sales doubled from US$470 million to US$1 billion. The same happened to the profits, e. g. in the six months before September 30, 2003 they increased to a total of US$115 million.

In 2005, Burberry announced Bravo would step down for Angela Ahrendts (formerly Liz Claiborne). After a 6 months transitional period, Bravo retired as a CEO and became vice chairman of Burberry.

Other roles 

 Member of the Fordham University Board of Trustees

Awards 

 1996: 75 Most Influential Women in business by Crain’s New York Business''''
 2004: Top 50 hall of fame by the Wall Street Journal
 2004: #13 most Powerful Women in Business outside the US by Fortune Magazine
 2005: #63 in Forbes list of The World's 100 Most Powerful Women
 2006: Commander of the British Empire by Queen Elizabeth II
 2006: Recipient of the Fordham Founder’s Award

Personal life 
Rose Marie Bravo is married to William Jackey.

Rose Marie Bravo is the owner of a large waterfront house in Long Island that sits on a 15-acre property, nearby Tuthill Cove. She listed it for sale in 2021 for $7,250,000.

References

External links 
Mammon Interview: Bravo encore at Burberry, Observer - The Guardian, June 2, 2002.

1951 births
Living people
The Bronx High School of Science alumni
American corporate directors
People from the Bronx
Fordham University alumni
American people of Italian descent
American chief executives of fashion industry companies
American women chief executives
Women corporate directors
21st-century American women